Almost Human is the second studio album by Cuban American dark cabaret singer Voltaire, released on August 1, 2000 through Projekt Records.

According to Voltaire on his official website, the album is intended to convey a "look at life from the perspective of Lucifer"; thus being, most of the album's tracks deal with existentialism, the human condition and the existence of God, in Voltaire's usual tongue-in-cheek humorous way. Also present in the album are covers of the traditional songs "El Barquito de Nuez" and "Ringo no Uta" – the first one was composed by famous Mexican songwriter Francisco Gabilondo Soler, while the second one was composed by Hachiro Sato and Manjome Tadashi for the 1945 film Soyokaze. They are fully sung in Spanish and Japanese, respectively.

The song "Almost Human" is a song from the perspective of Lucifer, and "Feathery Wings" from the perspective of the Angel of Death. "Anastasia" references the fate of Russian princess Anastasia Nikolayevna.

Voltaire originally wrote the track "The Night" in 1988; a more deathrock-inflected version of it would appear on his 2014 album Raised by Bats.

The track "Alchemy Mondays" is a tribute to the eponymous goth event which used to take place at the famous, now-defunct music club CBGB, in Manhattan. Musician Myke Hideous of Misfits and The Bronx Casket Co. fame is also mentioned on the song's lyrics.

Track listing

Personnel
Voltaire — vocals/acoustic guitar
Gregor Kitzis — violin
Matthew Goeke — cello
George Grant — bass
Stephen Moses/Grisha Alexiev — drums

References

External links
Voltaire's official website
Almost Human on Projekt Records' official website

Voltaire (musician) albums
Projekt Records albums
2000 albums